The Gulf Cooperation Council Youth Athletics Championships is a biennial international athletics competition between youth athletes (under-18) from nations within the Cooperation Council for the Arab States of the Gulf. The competition was first held in 2000 and its events are incorporated into the schedule for the senior level Gulf Cooperation Council Athletics Championships. Like the senior event, the youth competitions are available for male athletes only, reflecting the participating countries' emphasis on track and field as mainly a male preserve.

Editions

See also
GCC Champions League, a regional football competition for Gulf states

References

Under-18 athletics competitions
Athletics competitions in Asia
Gulf Cooperation Council
Sport in the Middle East
Athletics
Recurring sporting events established in 2000
Men's athletics competitions
Biennial athletics competitions
2000 establishments in Asia